The Bandera County Courthouse and Jail are two separate historic county governmental buildings located near each other in Bandera, Bandera County, Texas, The Bandera County Courthouse, built in 1890 at the corner of Main and Pecan streets, is a Renaissance Revival style building designed by San Antonio architect B. F. Trester. It is three-story building with a central clock tower made from rusticated limestone cut from a local quarry. The clock is non-functioning and painted on, displaying the time 10:10. The current jail is a non-historic, modern facility located along State Highway 16 on the north end of town.

Former courthouse and jail

Bandera County was organized in 1856 and used makeshift quarters for jail and courthouse functions until 1877, when the county purchased a two-story stone building constructed in 1868 which is now known as the Old Courthouse. The building served as county courthouse until the present courthouse was built in 1891. A former one-story cut stone jail adjacent to the Old Courthouse designed by San Antonio architect Alfred Giles was built in 1881. On October 31, 1979, the two buildings, located on 12th St. between Maple St. and SH 16, were added to the National Register of Historic Places as a single entry. The two buildings are also jointly listed as a State Antiquities Landmark.

See also

National Register of Historic Places listings in Bandera County, Texas
Recorded Texas Historic Landmarks in Bandera County
List of county courthouses in Texas

References

External links

County courthouses in Texas
Courthouses on the National Register of Historic Places in Texas
Jails on the National Register of Historic Places in Texas
Buildings and structures in Bandera County, Texas
Renaissance Revival architecture in Texas
Clock towers in Texas
Texas State Antiquities Landmarks
Recorded Texas Historic Landmarks
National Register of Historic Places in Bandera County, Texas
Jails in Texas